The second Martin ministry was the tenth ministry of the Colony of New South Wales, and second of three occasions of being led by James Martin QC.

Martin was elected in the first free elections for the New South Wales Legislative Assembly held in 1856. He came to power as Premier on the first occasion after he defeated Charles Cowper's government fell in October 1863. Martin was asked to form government on the second occasion, this time in coalition with his former rival, Henry Parkes, after Cowper again lost the confidence of the Assembly in December 1865.

The title of Premier was widely used to refer to the Leader of Government, but not enshrined in formal use until 1920.

There was no party system in New South Wales politics until 1887. Under the constitution, ministers were required to resign to recontest their seats in a by-election when appointed. Such ministerial by-elections were usually uncontested and each of James Martin (The Lachlan), Henry Parkes (Kiama), James Byrnes (Parramatta) and Geoffrey Eagar (West Sydney) were re-elected unopposed. A poll was required in Patrick's Plains (Bowie Wilson) and Yass Plains (Robert Isaacs) however both ministers were comfortably re-elected with more than 70% of the vote.

This ministry covers the period from 22 January 1866 until 26 October 1868, when Martin resigned.

Composition of ministry

 
Ministers are members of the Legislative Assembly unless otherwise noted.

See also

Self-government in New South Wales
Members of the New South Wales Legislative Assembly, 1864–1869
First Martin ministry (1863–1865)
Third Martin ministry (1870–1872)

References

 

New South Wales ministries
1866 establishments in Australia
1868 disestablishments in Australia